Joseph Francois (born September 1, 1970), better known by his stage name Joe Blakk, is an American rapper and activist from New Orleans. He gained success in the early 1990s after releasing his hit song "It Ain't Where Ya From" and later "Boot Up or Shut Up."

Career
Joe Blakk was raised in the Christopher Homes Housing Development in the Algiers neighborhood of New Orleans. While in his senior year at Southern University, he released his debut album It Ain't Where Ya From on Mercenary Records. The album produced by Ice Mike, sold 75,000 units, along with the hit song which became very Popular in New Orleans.
His second single titled JB's Revenge which was also a commercial hit was released in 1994. In 1998 he released the single "Boot Up or Shut Up" which became his biggest hit peaked at #41 on the Hot R&B/Hip-Hop Songs chart. The single would later be released on Joe Blakk's second album Blood, Sweat & Tears. 
After becoming a Bounce sensation and a successful rapper, he's know an activist and the owner of Joe Blakk Income Tax Service in New Orleans. He is widely known in Louisiana as a Bounce Legend.

Discography
1993: It Ain't Where Ya From
1998: Blood, Sweat & Tears

Singles

As lead artist

References

1970 births
Living people
Rappers from New Orleans
Southern University alumni
21st-century American rappers
African-American male rappers
21st-century American male musicians
21st-century African-American musicians
20th-century African-American people